Pathé Bangoura (born January 22, 1984) is a Guinean former professional footballer who played as a forward. Bangoura played in France, for Saint-Étienne and Valence, as well as Azerbaijan where he played for Gänclärbirliyi Sumqayit, FK Baku, Olimpik Baku, and Muğan FK. He made one appearance for the Guinea national team in 2004.

Career
Whilst playing for FK Baku in August 2006, Bangoura was subjected to racist abuse by Khazar Lankaran supporters. Following a series of discipline issues whilst at FK Baku, including being suspended from training, Bangoura was released during the winter transfer window.

Bangoura's only appearance for Guinea came in 2004.

Career statistics

References

External links

1984 births
Living people
Sportspeople from Conakry
Guinean footballers
Guinea international footballers
Association football forwards
Ligue 2 players
ASOA Valence players
AS Saint-Étienne players
FC Baku players
AZAL PFK players
FK Mughan players
Hapoel Be'er Sheva F.C. players
Guinean expatriate footballers
Expatriate footballers in France
Guinean expatriate sportspeople in France
Expatriate footballers in Azerbaijan
Guinean expatriate sportspeople in Azerbaijan
Expatriate footballers in Israel
Guinean expatriate sportspeople in Israel
FK Genclerbirliyi Sumqayit players